Margaretta Taylor (born 1942) is an American billionaire heiress.

She was born Margaretta Johnson, the daughter of Anne Cox Chambers, and the granddaughter of the newspaper publisher James M. Cox. As of May 2, 2022, her net worth is $4.7 billion.

In 2015,  her mother Anne Cox Chambers distributed her 49% share in Cox Enterprises equally between her three children: Katharine Rayner, Margaretta Taylor, and James Cox Chambers.

Since January 2018, her son Alexander C. Taylor has been the CEO of Cox Enterprises.

References

American billionaires
Female billionaires
Cox family
Living people
1942 births
Place of birth missing (living people)